Scythris cretiflua is a moth of the family Scythrididae. It was described by Edward Meyrick in 1913. It is found in South Africa (Gauteng, Mpumalanga).

The wingspan is 12–14 mm. The forewings are ochreous whitish and the hindwings are pale greyish.

References

Endemic moths of South Africa
cretiflua
Moths described in 1913